Walking My Baby Back Home is a 1953 American musical comedy film directed by Lloyd Bacon and starring Donald O'Connor, Janet Leigh, and Buddy Hackett. It was Hackett's film debut.

Excerpts of the film are used in the Columbo episode "Forgotten Lady", in which Leigh plays a middle aged former film star Grace Wheeler who nostalgically watches the film.

Donald O'Connor enjoyed working with Janet Leigh.

She hadn't danced in years but was a real trouper. Nine times out of 10 we'd do all those beautiful dance routines on cement, and she got very tired, started falling a lot on her knees. And her knees started to swell three times their normal size. It was very painful. On the screen you can't tell how she was suffering in that darn thing.

Plot
A World War II veteran joins a minstrel show and falls in love with the daughter of the troupe's patriarch.

Cast
Donald O'Connor as Clarence "Jigger" Miller
Janet Leigh as Chris Hall
Buddy Hackett as Blimp Edwards
Lori Nelson as Claire Millard
Scatman Crothers as "Smiley" Gordon
Kathleen Lockhart as Mrs. Millard
George Cleveland as Col. Dan Wallace
John Hubbard as Rodney Millard
Norman Abbott as Doc
Phil Garris as Hank
Walter Kingsford as Uncle Henry Hall
Sidney Miller as Walter Thomas
The Modernaires as themselves
The Sportsmen Quartet as themselves (credited as The Sportsmen)

References

External links

1953 films
1953 musical comedy films
American musical comedy films
Films directed by Lloyd Bacon
1950s English-language films
1950s American films